Elizabeth "Lizzie" Cui (born 12 August 1997) is a diver from New Zealand.

She competed at the 2015 World Aquatics Championships. Cui is a five-time national champion and record holder. In heading to Rio de Janeiro, Cui marked the first time New Zealand had been represented in the sport since the 1992 Olympic Games in Barcelona. Cui competed for LSU from 2016 to 2019 and remains one of the most decorated diving athletes in LSU history. Cui still holds the women's 3 meter record and ended her career gaining two more SEC silver medals to her collection making it four SEC medals. In her athletic career, Cui placed fifth at her sophomore year and sixth in her senior year at the NCAA championships in the 1 meter springboard event. Her highest 3 meter placing at the NCAA championships was tenth in her senior season. Cui was named most valuable player consecutively for three years.

During the 2019 World Championships, Cui placed eighth in the 1 meter event at the 2019 World Championships in Guangju, South Korea. At this event she also placed thirteenth on 3 meter and ninth in the mixed synchronised event alongside partner Anton Down-Jenkins.

See also
 New Zealand at the 2015 World Aquatics Championships

References

New Zealand female divers
Living people
Place of birth missing (living people)
1997 births
Olympic divers of New Zealand
Divers at the 2016 Summer Olympics
Divers at the 2018 Commonwealth Games
Commonwealth Games competitors for New Zealand